The Gerd Müller Trophy, previously known  as Striker of the Year or Best Striker Award in its first edition, is an association football award presented annually by France Football to the highest-scoring footballer in the previous season. 

It was established in 2021, taking into account that calendar year (while, from the second edition, the award is based on the amount of goals scored throughout a season). 

From 2021–22, the award was renamed after German striker Gerd Müller who died in August 2021.

The inaugural winner, as well as the current title holder, is Polish striker Robert Lewandowski; he won the first edition in 2021 by scoring 64 goals over the year and then repeated a year later, having scored 57 goals in 56 appearances over the 2021–22 season.

Winners

Key

Striker of the Year

Gerd Müller Trophy

Wins by country

Wins by club

See also
 Ballon d'Or
 European Golden Shoe

References

European football trophies and awards
Awards established in 2022
Ballon d'Or
France Football awards